Fattoush (also fattush, fatush, fattoosh, and fattouche) is a Levantine salad made from toasted or fried pieces of khubz (Arabic flat bread) combined with mixed greens and other vegetables, such as radishes and tomatoes. Fattoush is popular among all communities in the Levant.

Etymology
Fattūsh is derived from the Arabic fatt "crush" and the suffix of Turkic origin -ūsh. Coining words this way was common in Levantine Arabic.

Ingredients
Fattoush belongs to the family of dishes known as fattat (plural of fatteh), which use stale flatbread as a base.
Fattoush includes vegetables and herbs varying by season and taste. The vegetables are cut into relatively large pieces compared to tabbouleh which requires ingredients to be finely chopped. Sumac is usually used to give fattoush its sour taste, while some recipes also add pomegranate molasses along with the sumac.

See also
 Dakos
 Arabic salad
 List of bread dishes
 List of hors d'oeuvre
 List of salads
 Panzanella, an Italian bread salad

References

Bibliography

Appetizers
Arab cuisine
Assyrian cuisine
Bread salads
Levantine cuisine
Lenten foods

Lebanese cuisine
Iraqi cuisine